Ernst Oppacher was an Austrian singles figure skater and the 1921 and 1922 Austrian national champion. He won the bronze medal at the 1924 Worlds and the 1922 Europeans.

Competitive highlights

References
 Interwiki-German

Navigation

Austrian male single skaters
World Figure Skating Championships medalists
European Figure Skating Championships medalists
Date of birth missing
Date of death missing